Stephanie Wagner (born 17 September 1994) is a German tennis player. She has a career-high singles ranking by the Women's Tennis Association (WTA) of 263, achieved on 14 September 2020. Her best doubles ranking of world No. 546, she reached on 25 November 2019.

Wagner made her WTA Tour main-draw debut at the 2021 Courmayeur Ladies Open, when she qualified for the main draw, defeating Tara Moore in the final qualifying round.

She played collegiate tennis for the Miami Hurricanes at the University of Miami in Coral Gables, Florida.

Singles performance timeline 

Only main-draw results in WTA Tour are included in win–loss records.

ITF Circuit finals

Singles: 2 (2 runner–ups)

Doubles: 1 (1 title)

References

External links
 
 
 Stephanie Wagner at the University of Miami

1994 births
Living people
German female tennis players
Miami Hurricanes women's tennis players
People from Amberg
Sportspeople from the Upper Palatinate
Tennis people from Bavaria